Sawaki (written: 沢木 or 澤木 lit. "swamp tree") is a Japanese surname. Notable people with the surname include:

, Japanese voice actor
, Japanese long-distance runner
, Japanese Zen Buddhist
, Japanese actor

Fictional characters
, protagonist of the manga series Moyashimon

Japanese-language surnames